Vitamin D is a group of fat-soluble prohormones.

Vitamin D may also refer to:

Vitamin D vitamers
 Ergocalciferol (vitamin D2)
 Cholecalciferol (vitamin D3)
 22-Dihydroergocalciferol (vitamin D4)
 Vitamin D5

Other uses
 "Vitamin D" (Glee), an episode of the television series Glee
 "Vitamin D" (song), a song by Ludacris and Ty Dolla Sign

See also
 Calcifediol (25-hydroxyvitamin D or 25(OH)D), an indicator of vitamin D status in the blood
 Calcitriol (1,25-dihydroxyvitamin D or 1,25(OH)2D), the active hormonal form of vitamin D
 Calcitroic acid (1,24,25-trihydroxyvitamin D), the major metabolite of calcitriol
 Vitamin D and respiratory tract infections
 Vitamin D and neurology
 Vitamin D toxicity, hypervitaminosis D, toxicity caused by the ingestion of large doses of vitamin D 
 Vitamin D deficiency, hypovitaminosis D, a condition with deficiency of vitamin D
 Vitamin D-binding protein, encoded by the GC gene, binds vitamin D in blood
 Vitamin D receptor (VDR), or calcitriol receptor, the intracellular receptor for vitamin D
 Vitamin D response element (VDRE) is a DNA sequence found in the promoter region of vitamin D regulated genes
 Vitamin D-dependent calcium-binding proteins, including calbindins and S100G
 Vitamin D resistant rickets, X-linked hypophosphatemia, a form of rickets for which ingestion of vitamin D is relatively ineffective